"Find Tomorrow (Ocarina)" is a song by Belgian electronic DJ duo Dimitri Vegas & Like Mike, Wolfpack and Katy B. It was co-written by Kinetics & One Love, Erin Beck, and Belgian musician Sammy Merayah, and features vocals from UK recording artist Katy B. The single was released in Belgium as a digital download on 29 November 2013, and peaked at number 2 there. The song is a vocal version of Vegas & Mike's previous collaboration with Wolfpack, "Ocarina (The TomorrowWorld Anthem)", which was released two months earlier.

Track listing

Chart performance

Weekly charts

Year-end charts

Release history

References 

2013 songs
2013 singles
Katy B songs
Songs written by Erin Beck
Songs written by One Love (record producer)
Songs written by Kinetics (rapper)
Dimitri Vegas & Like Mike songs